The following are the 16 national parks of Germany, sorted from North to South:

Germany also has 14 Biosphere Reserves, as well as 98 nature parks. Including the national protected areas, about 25% of Germany's area is national parks or nature parks.

See also
 List of nature parks in Germany
 Natural National Landscapes

References

External links 

National Parks and other Protected Areas
Map/list of German National Parks (unofficial)
Map of German National Parks with various filtering options

Germany
National parks of Germany
 
National parks